Lotte FrieseKorn (1 September 1899 – 14 October 1963) was a German politician of the Free Democratic Party (FDP) and former member of the German Bundestag.

Life 
She was a member of the state parliament in North Rhine-Westphalia from 1947 to 1954. Friese-Korn was a member of the German Bundestag from 1953 to 1961. She had stood as a candidate in the Bundestag elections on 6 September 1953 in the constituency of 82 Rheydt-Mönchengladbach-Viersen and entered the Bundestag via the state list.

Literature

References

1899 births
1963 deaths
Members of the Bundestag for North Rhine-Westphalia
Members of the Bundestag 1957–1961
Members of the Bundestag 1953–1957
Female members of the Bundestag
20th-century German women politicians
Members of the Bundestag for the Free Democratic Party (Germany)
Members of the Landtag of North Rhine-Westphalia